The Group 1965 (in ) is a Japanese contemporary art group formed by Makoto Aida, Sumihisa Arima, Parco Kinoshita, Hiroyuki Matsukage, Oscar Oiwa, and Tsuyoshi Ozawa.

Selected exhibitions
A partial list of exhibitions since 1994:

1994 – Press conference performance, NHK Studio, Tokyo
1994 – Nasubi Gallery: Showa 40 Nenkai (The Group 1965), Roppongi Wave, Tokyo
1996 – The Group 1965 Performance, lecture, workshop, Takamatsu City Museum of Art, Ehime
1997–98 – The Group 1965 - The Voices from Tokyo, Galeria Metropolitana de Barcelona, Barcelona, Spain / Galerie Espace Flon, Lausanne, Switzerland / ACC Galerie Weimar, Weimar, Germany
1999 – The Group 1965 - The Voices from Tokyo, Contemporary Art Factory, Tokyo
1999 – Shine or Rain, Nadiff, Tokyo
2000 – The Group 1965 in Osaka, Gallery Kodama, Osaka
2005 – 40 x40 Project: 40 (Sa Sip) exhibition Alternative Space Loop, Club Latino, Seoul
2005 –BankART Life, BankART Studio NYK, Yokohama
2005 – 40 x 40 project: The Group 1965 Seven Samurais, Even, Hiroshima City Museum of Contemporary Art, Hiroshima
2008 –The Group 1965's Tokyo Guide, Nadiff apart, Tokyo
2011 – We are boys! Künsthalle Düsseldorf, Germany
2011 – The Group 1965 Arsenalle Kyiv, Ukraine
2013 – We are boys! Kamada benefit society museum of local history, Sakaide, Kagawa
2013 – The Group 1965 Ogi-school  Setouchi Triennale 2013,  Ogishima, Takamatsu, Kagawa
2016 – The Group 1965 Ogi-school  Setouchi Triennale 2016, Ogishima, Takamatsu, Kagawa

References

Contemporary painters
Japanese artist groups and collectives
Culture in Tokyo